Trochozonites usambarensis is a species of air-breathing land snail, a terrestrial pulmonate gastropod mollusks in the family Urocyclidae.

This species is endemic to Tanzania.

References

Endemic fauna of Tanzania
Urocyclidae
Taxonomy articles created by Polbot